Bridgerweight  is a weight class in professional boxing created and used by the World Boxing Council (WBC). The weight is named after six-year-old American Bridger Walker, who saved his four-year-old sister from a stray dog in July 2020.

History
After presenting Bridger Walker with a championship belt and naming him an "Honorary Champion" in July 2020, the WBC announced the establishment of bridgerweight four months later on November 9. WBC president Mauricio Sulaiman said of the decision to create the new weight: "We have decided to create a new division called Bridger, as it is the bridge necessary to serve the large number of boxers who are between 200 and 224-pounds. This name is inspired by that hero of humanity, that six-year-old boy who heroically saved his four-year-old sister from an attack by a wild dog during the pandemic; yes, this new division is inspired by Bridger Walker."

This would move the cruiserweight limit out of line with the other major sanctioning organisations.

In December 2020, the WBC announced the first set of rankings for the new division, with Óscar Rivas at #1.

The first fight took place on April 3, 2021 with Geovany Bruzon defeating Jose German Garcia Montes by eight-round technical decision to win the WBC Latino title.

The inaugural world championship fight took place on October 22 between Oscar Rivas and Ryan Rozicki, with Rivas winning via twelve-round unanimous decision.

Reaction
As of January 2023, none of the other major sanctioning organizations (WBA, IBF, WBO) have adopted the new weight class. Editor-in-chief of The Ring, Doug Fischer, said in November 2020 when asked if the magazine would recognise the new weight class that "I’ll pose (the question) to the Ring Ratings Panel. For the time being, however, the answer is no. It’s brand new and the WBC has yet to arrange a bout for their inaugural title. But if the WBC is able to put together a credible top 10-25 of small heavyweights that are cool with being ranked as ‘Bridgerweights’ and if the concept catches on with the other major sanctioning organizations, who knows? Maybe we’ll have to recognize it.”. Deontay Wilder, who has fought within the bridgerweight limits for much of his career, said that he was not interested in fighting at the weight.

List of champions

References

Boxing weight classes

Bridgerweight boxers